Laurie Ann Paul (born 1966) is a professor of philosophy and cognitive science at Yale University. She previously taught at the University of North Carolina at Chapel Hill and the University of Arizona. She is best known for her research on the counterfactual analysis of causation and the concept of "transformative experience."

Biography and career 

Born November 10, 1966, Paul graduated from Antioch College in Yellow Springs, Ohio, in 1990 with a BA in chemistry. Before going to graduate school, Paul corresponded with a number of philosophers about their work, including Nancy Cartwright and Lynne Rudder Baker.  In 1999, Paul graduated from Princeton University with a PhD in philosophy, where she wrote a dissertation titled Essays on Causation under the supervision of David Lewis.

Paul taught at Yale University from 1999 to 2001, and at the University of Arizona from 2001 until 2008, before moving to North Carolina.  She has also held appointments at the Australian National University and at the University of St. Andrews.

Philosophical work 

Paul's principal research interests are in metaphysics and the philosophy of mind. Her work focuses on causation, mereology, the philosophy of time, and related topics in phenomenology, the philosophy of science, and philosophy of language. Her work in ontology and mereology develops a distinctive view of objects as fusions of property instances. Her article "What You Can't Expect When You're Expecting" develops the notion of transformative experience and explores its consequences for the possibility of rational decision-making.

She has written more than twenty articles, and is the editor of Causation and Counterfactuals, co-author of Causation: A User's Guide, and author of Transformative Experience.

Awards
Paul has received the following awards:
 A grant from the John Templeton Foundation to study religious and transformative experience.http://news.nd.edu/news/49074-notre-dame-and-unc-chapel-hill-philosophers-to-examine-religious-and-transformative-experiences/
 A Guggenheim Fellowship (2014).
 An NHC Fellowship (2011-2012) from the National Humanities Center.
 An Institute for Advanced Study Research Fellowship at the Australian National University.

Selected works
 
 2014. Transformative Experience. Oxford University Press, ISBN
 2013. Causation: A User's Guide. Oxford University Press, .
 2010. "Temporal Experience". The Journal of Philosophy CVII (7) 333–359. Reprinted in The Future of the Philosophy of Time, edited by Adrian Bardon. New York: Routledge (2012).
 2010. "The Counterfactual Analysis of Causation". In The Oxford Handbook on Causation, edited by Helen Beebee, Christopher Hitchcock and Peter Menzies Oxford University Press, .
 2006. "Coincidence as Overlap". Noûs, 40: 623–649.
 2004. Causation and Counterfactuals. Co-edited with Ned Hall and John Collins. MIT Press, .
 2002. "Logical Parts". Noûs, 36: 578–596. Reprinted in Metaphysics volume v, edited by Michael Rea. Routledge 2008, .
 1999. Essays on Causation. Princeton University

References

External links
 
 L.A. Paul's Homepage at UNC Chapel Hill 
 Conversation on Causation and Counterfactuals with Ned Hall on Philosophy TV
 Interview on the radio show "Philosophy Talk" with Ken Taylor and John Perry

1966 births
Living people
University of North Carolina at Chapel Hill faculty
Academics of the University of St Andrews
American women philosophers
Causality
Metaphysicians
Philosophers of mind
Antioch College alumni
Ontologists
Philosophers of science
Philosophers of language
Princeton University alumni
21st-century American philosophers
21st-century American women